Richard M. Sillitto (1923 – 19 April 2005) was an optical physicist who wrote a useful text on quantum mechanics. He was a Fellow of the Royal Society of Edinburgh and Fellow of the Institute of Physics as well as a past president of the Scottish branch of the Institute of Physics. Sillitto was Reader and Reader Emeritus in the Physics department of the University of Edinburgh.

Bibliography
Nonrelativistic Quantum Mechanics, Richard Sillitto, (1967), Publ. Edinburgh UP, 
Geometrical and Physical Optics, R M Sillitto, Longman Higher Education,

External links
Personal pages
McClure organ, Caprington horn
Maskelyne on Schiehallion
Forty years of optics
The durability of Maxwell's equations

The proposed book "Geometrical and Physical Optics, R M Sillitto, Longman Higher Education, " was never completed.

1923 births
2005 deaths
Scottish physicists
Fellows of the Royal Society of Edinburgh
Academics of the University of Edinburgh
Fellows of the Institute of Physics